

Series overview

Episodes

Season 1 (1961–62)

Season 2 (1962–63)

Season 3 (1963–64)

Season 4 (1964–65)

Season 5 (1965–66)

References

Lists of American drama television series episodes